The 2010 special election for the 1st congressional district of Hawaii was a special election to the United States House of Representatives that took place to fill the vacancy caused by Representative Neil Abercrombie's resignation on February 28, 2010 to focus on his campaign for Governor of Hawaii in the 2010 gubernatorial election. Abercrombie planned to not run for re-election in 2010, and many of the candidates that were running for his open seat transferred to the special election. The election was held on May 22, 2010 and Republican Charles Djou won, defeating five Democrats, four fellow Republicans, and four Independent candidates. The main reason for his win was because there were two Democratic candidates instead of one, which split the votes, allowing Djou to win, as Hawaii is an overwhelmingly Democratic state. Djou became the first Republican elected to Congress from Hawaii since Pat Saiki in 1988; Djou volunteered on Saiki's 1988 campaign, and Saiki served as Djou's campaign chair in 2010. , this was the last time in which a Republican was elected to Congress from Hawaii.

Special election rules
The election was held without a primary, meaning all candidates from all parties ran against one another and the person with the most votes (even if only a plurality) won; there was no runoff. With three top-tier candidates running, two Democrats and one Republican, it was considered likely that the two Democrats would split the vote leading to a Republican victory.

The election was conducted as a Vote-By-Mail election. All registered voters as of the voter registration deadline were automatically mailed a packet containing the Vote-By-Mail ballot and return envelopes. No polling places were open on May 22, 2010. Ballots were mailed approximately 20 days prior to the election. Voted ballots had to be received by the State of Hawaii Office of Elections no later than 6:00 p.m., May 22, 2010 in the return envelopes provided.

Any voter requiring the use of an accessible voting machine could do so at the Office of the City Clerk, Honolulu Hale, 530 S. King St. from Monday, May 10, 2010 to Thursday, May 20, 2010, excluding Sundays and holidays between the hours of 8:00 a.m. to 4:00 p.m. Walk-in voting was open on Saturdays during this period.

Candidates

Democrats
Vinny Browne
Ed Case
Del Castillo
Colleen Hanabusa
Philmund Lee

Republicans
Charles Amsterdam
Charles Collins
Douglas Crum
Charles Djou
John Giuffre

No party affiliation
Jim Brewer
Karl F. Moseley
Kalaeloa Strode
Steve Tataii

(List of candidates appearing on the May 22, 2010 State of Hawaii, U.S. Representative District 1 Special Vacancy Election ballot.)

Campaign
Democratic leaders conceded that the winner-take-all primary favored the one lone Republican in the race. The Republican National Committee (RNC) indicated it may directly support Djou with the hope of winning a congressional seat in a historically Democratic state; RNC political director Gentry Collins referred to Scott Brown's victory in a Massachusetts special election for the U.S. Senate in stating: "I think for us to win that seat will send a signal that what happened in Massachusetts is not an isolated event."

Both Case and Hanabusa represented different wings of the party, Case being more of a blue-dog moderate Democrat, while Hanabusa is preferred by the liberal wing. Hanabusa secured the endorsement of EMILY's List, the local party establishment, and local labor unions. Case was at odds with the party establishment over his primary challenge to U.S. Senator Daniel Akaka in 2006 when he was still Representative of the 2nd district, although Case claimed that any bad blood with the Democratic electorate over the primary challenge was gone, according to his internal polling.  Case also criticized Hanabusa for keeping her post as president of the State Senate while attempting to campaign, saying: "It is inconsistent for her to want to run the Senate in a time of crisis for our state and want to run a full-fledged congressional campaign." The national Democratic Party establishment and the Obama administration signaled Case was their pick, believing him more electable than Hanabusa. Case received support from the Democratic Congressional Campaign Committee while Hanabusa said she hadn't spoken to them since the previous year.

Both Case and Hanabusa proposed that the other drop out for the sake of party unity.  The Democratic Congressional Campaign Committee (DCCC) dispatched an aide to the state in the hopes of at least ensuring no other Democrats enter the race. It was unlikely either Democrat would drop out; both represented different views and both already faced off in a 2002 special election for Hawaii's 2nd congressional district, which Case won. The DCCC chairman Congressman Chris Van Hollen said he was counting on Abercrombie to help keep the seat Democratic; indicating that endorsements would be used to show which Democrat was preferred by the national party. On May 10, 2010, the DCCC said it would not spend any further resources on the race, preferring to save those resources for the November election.

Endorsements

Polling

Results

References

External links
Hawaii Office of Elections website
Official results from Hawaii Office of Elections website Archived

Debates 
 Hawaii 1st District House Special Election Debate, C-SPAN, May 7, 2010

Official candidates sites 
Vinny Browne
Ed Case campaign
Rafael Del Castillo
Charles Collins
Charles Djou
Colleen Hanabusa

Hawaii 2010 01
Hawaii 2010 01
2010 01 Special
Hawaii 01 Special
United States House of Representatives 01 Special
United States House of Representatives 2010 01